para-Chloroamphetamine (PCA), also known as 4-chloroamphetamine (4-CA), is a substituted amphetamine and monoamine releaser similar to MDMA, but with substantially higher neurotoxicity, thought to be due to the unrestrained release of both serotonin and dopamine by a metabolite. It is used as a neurotoxin by neurobiologists to selectively kill serotonergic neurons for research purposes, in the same way that 6-hydroxydopamine is used to kill dopaminergic neurons.

para-Chloroamphetamine has been detected as an apparent designer drug, along with the related 3-chloroamphetamine, which is even more potent as a releaser of dopamine and serotonin but slightly less neurotoxic.

The closely related N-methylated derivative, para-chloromethamphetamine (CMA), which is metabolized to para-chloroamphetamine in vivo, has neurotoxic properties as well.

Legal status

China
As of October 2015, 4-CA is a controlled substance in China.

See also
 Substituted amphetamines
 para-Chloromethamphetamine (4-CMA)
 Chlorphentermine
 3,4-Dichloroamphetamine (DCA)
 4-Fluoroamphetamine (4-FA)
 4-Methylamphetamine (4-MA)
 5,7-Dihydroxytryptamine (5,7-DHT)
 para-Bromoamphetamine (PBA)
 para-Iodoamphetamine (PIA)

References 

Neurotoxins
Substituted amphetamines
Chlorobenzenes
Serotonin-norepinephrine-dopamine releasing agents
Designer drugs